is a Japanese chef, TV personality, and chanson singer. Her father is French writer Imao Hirano. Her husband is illustrator Makoto Wada. Her eldest son is Sho Wada, member of the band Triceratops, and whose wife is the actress Juri Ueno. The wife of her second son is chef and model Asuka Wada. Her grandfather is Japanese art historian and jurist Henry Pike Bowie.

Filmography

TV appearances

Commercials

Discography

Singles

Albums

Compilation albums

Bibliography

References

External links
 

Japanese chefs
Japanese entertainers
Japanese women singers
1947 births
Living people
People from Taitō